Bruno Rossignol (born 1958 in Nanterre) is a French composer, choral conductor and conductor, pianist and music educator.

Biography 
He studied music at the École normale de musique de Paris and the Sorbonne. He then directed choirs: first trainee conductor at the Paris Opera and at the choir of the Orchestre de Paris (by Jean Laforge and Arthur Oldham), he was then founding conductor of the Île-de-France Chamber Choir. (first prize of the International competitions of Malta in 1989 and Verona in 1993). With this ensemble, he received the Grand Prix des Hauts-de-Seine in 1996.

From 1985 to 1995, he was the choir conductor of the musical shows of Jean-Michel Jarre, whom he accompanied in London, Paris-La Défense (1990), Berlin, Budapest, Seville, Barcelona, Santiago de Compostela, Mont-Saint-Michel.

He was director of the Conservatories of Jouy-en-Josas from 1989 to 1992, Suresnes from 1992 to 1997, Orsay from 1997 to 2000, Bourges from 2000 to 2005 and Hector Berlioz in Paris 10th from 2005 to 2010. He conducted the adult choir of the Paul Dukas conservatory in Paris 12th from 2006 to 2010.

In 2011, he was appointed director of the Conservatoire à rayonnement départemental (CRD) de la Dordogne and artistic director of the Dordogne instrumental ensemble. (E.I.D.) with which he performs mainly in the regions Aquitaine. At the same time he creates the Dordogne choir which becomes the Paratge choir in 2016. He joined Paris that same year to take over the direction of the Jean-Philippe Rameau conservatory (6th arrondissement of Paris).

Works 
Bruno Rossignol composes choral works such as Ave verum, Exurgens autem Maria and Salve Regina pour un tombeau de Francis Poulenc. He mainly writes a large number of instrumental pieces (Le Roi des grenouilles, Les Nouvelles Histoires Naturelles and Curieuses rencontres) through which he expresses his vocation as a teacher.

Cantata : 
L'escalier (2007), choir with four mixed voices.

Concertos:
Concerto pour harpe, premiered in 2008 by Sabine Chefson
Concerto pour violon, premiered in 2000 by Annie Jodry.

Mélodies: 
Les nouvelles histoires naturelles for soprano, baritone and piano, on texts by Jules Renard.
  
Chamber music:
Aria (1995), violin and piano
Au père lapin (1997), trumpet and piano
Ballade irlandaise (1988), flute and piano
Carillon (2008), horn and piano
Danse des sylphes (1988), flute and piano
Danse du paon, horn and piano
Défilé (2012), trombone and piano
Divertissement (1995), three flutes
Élégie (1984), oboe and piano
Interlude maya, viola and guitar
Jazz notes violon 2 with Alexandre Tenaud, (1992), violin and piano
Jean-Paul's march (2000), horn and piano
La jument grise, percussion and piano
La meunière a neuf écus (2014), violin and piano.
Le sentier des sources, Celtic harp
Le songe d'Hector (2007), oboe and piano
Le violon en herbe (1995), violin and piano
Loup yétu (2012), violin and piano
Manège, saxophone and piano
Novelettes (2000): Au clair de la terre, Mélodie irlandaise and Promenade romantique, three pieces for cello and piano
Ode rose (2008), clarinet and piano
Orphée et Calupan (2010), pieces with four hands and six hands
Pavane en deux tons (1984), horn and piano
Rag (2008), oboe and piano
Ravel blues (1988), violin and piano
Rhapsodie-jeu (1994), saxophone and piano
Saudade (2002), violin and piano
Suite (1996), flute, clarinet and piano
Trois bagatelles (2005), obie, cello and piano
Trois pièces (2006), percussions
Trois toiles pour rêver, three clarinets

Music for choir:
Ave verum (2005)
Dona nobis pacem (2015)
Exsurgens autem Maria (premiered in May 2014 as part of the 900th anniversary celebrations of the Pontigny Abbey)
De la mer... (1994), female four-voice choir
Demain (1999)
L’A.B.C. d’un chœur (1997)
La mer est entrée dans les prés (2016)
Louange (1994), female four-voice choir
Que tu es belle ! (1994), female four-voice choir
Risotto musicale - Trois registres parlando (2004)
Salve Regina - pour un tombeau de Francis Poulenc (1998)
Stabat Mater (1999)

Music for soloist:
 Cilaos (2000), harp
 Curieuses rencontres (1985): Le petit garçon qui marchait sur la lune, Au clair de la terre, La planète où dansent les fourmis bleues, L'astéroïde B 612 et Les étoiles, five pieces for piano
 En Bretagne (1996), piano
 In memoriam J.M.R. (2004), saxophone
 Le roi des grenouilles (1993), five piano pieces, based on Grimm's fairy tale
 Mouvements perpétuels (2013), piano
 Paysages en coin (2004), piano
 Philémon (2012), horn
 Quel cirque (1991), piano
 Reflet orange et reflet bleu, Celtic harp
 Soirées sous la lune (2008), guitar
 Valse chagrine (1988), clarinet
 Valse tendre et aristocratique (2001), piano.

Opera: 
Madame Roland, created in Suresnes as part of the bicentenary events of the Revolution.
 
Oratorio: 
La fin dau monde, (premiered on 26 and 27 April 2013 respectively in Sarlat and  Boulazac (Périgueux) écrit en Limousin dialect after a text by Jean-Yves Agard, docteur en sociologie, défenseur des langues régionales.

He has also transcribed for piano four hands great works from the repertoire:
 Pictures at an Exhibition by Moussorgski
 Prélude à l'après-midi d'un faune by Debussy
Un bal, extract of the Symphonie fantastique by Berlioz, editions Delatour.

Honours 
As choral conductior he won:
 First prize of the Malta International Competition in 1989
 First prize of the International Verona Competition (Italy) in 1993.
 Award for the best conductor of the Verona Festival 1993
 Grand prix de Hauts-de-Seine in 1996.
 The Médaille de la Ville de Paris in 1990

References

External links 
 Bruno ROSSIGNOL - La fin du monde - Oratorio en occitan limousin on YouTube

20th-century French composers
21st-century French composers
French male composers
French opera composers
Male opera composers
French choral conductors
French male conductors (music)
20th-century French male classical pianists
21st-century French male classical pianists
1958 births
People from Nanterre
Living people
20th-century French conductors (music)
21st-century French conductors (music)